Prechop is a technique used in phacoemulsification in cataract surgery that uses a special instrument to mechanically divide the nucleus of the cataract. It was described by Takayuki Akahoshi in 1998.

References 

Eye surgery